Private Worlds is a 1934 novel by the British writer Phyllis Bottome. It is set in a psychiatric hospital. It was the seventh most popular work of fiction published in America that year.

Adaptation
It was adapted into a 1935 American film of the same title directed by Gregory La Cava and starring Claudette Colbert, Charles Boyer and Joel McCrea.

References

Bibliography
 Goble, Alan. The Complete Index to Literary Sources in Film. Walter de Gruyter, 1999.
 Hayward, Rhodri. The Transformation of the Psyche in British Primary Care, 1870-1970.  A&C Black, 2014.
 Kimyongür, Angela. Women in Europe between the Wars: Politics, Culture and Society. Routledge,  2017.

1934 British novels
Novels by Phyllis Bottome
British novels adapted into films
Novels set in England
Penguin Books books
Novels set in hospitals